Ventdelplà was a Catalan TV series that was aired on TV3. It was created by Josep Maria Benet i Jornet and 365 episodes were aired between 2005 and 2010.

Plot
The plot centers on Teresa, a woman abused by her husband and who flees from Barcelona to the fictional village of Ventdelplà where she has an uncle, Gustau. Although initially intending to sell the house and go back to Barcelona, she stays in Ventdelplà. The series narrates the lives of the town's people.

Teresa Clarís is a housewife, married to a prestigious Barcelona lawyer. She has two children of 15 and 8 years, and completed medical studies. Her husband soon makes her drop everything to take care of the children and especially of him. When she wants to regain some independence, everything gets complicated. She has to flee and take refuge temporarily at her uncle Gustau in Ventdelplà.

Cast

References

Catalan television programmes
2005 Spanish television series debuts
2010 Spanish television series endings
2000s Spanish drama television series
2010s Spanish drama television series
Television series by Diagonal TV
Television shows set in Catalonia